Parco naturale del Sasso Simone e Simoncello is an Italian regional park founded in 1994. Is one of the four parks established by Marche.

History

Geography
The landscape presents hills and low mountains. The highest summit is Mount Carpegna, 1415 meters above the sea level.

Animals

Birds

Plants

Municipalities
The park is across the following municipalities: Carpegna, Frontino, Montecopiolo, Pennabilli, Piandimeleto, Pietrarubbia.

Activities
Many outdoor activities are possible within the park including,
Trekking
Cycling
Bird watching

References

External links

 

Marche
Sasso Simone e Simoncello
Sasso Simone e Simoncello
Sasso Simone e Simoncello
Sasso Simone e Simoncello
Montefeltro